Mo Heng (Bing) Tan (born February 28, 1913, date of death unknown) was the goalkeeper of the Dutch East Indies football team during the 1938 FIFA World Cup in France. The Dutch East Indian team only played one match after losing 0–6 to Hungary. He also had a mascot for the match. Tan became the only ex-Dutch East Indian team player to represent independent Indonesia in 1951, in an unofficial match against a Sino-Malayan Selection from Singapore.

References

External links
 

1913 births
Year of death missing
Indonesian footballers
Indonesia international footballers
Indonesian people of Chinese descent
Indonesian sportspeople of Chinese descent
Association football goalkeepers
Tiong Hoa Soerabaja players
1938 FIFA World Cup players